A handle is a grip attached to an object for using or moving the object.

Handle may also refer to:

Arts, entertainment, and media
 Handles (novel), a children's book by Jan Mark
 Handles, a character in the Doctor Who episode "The Time of the Doctor"

Computing and technology
 Handle (computing), an abstract reference to a resource
 Handle, in a communication system, is a:
 Pseudonym 
User name 
 Handle, in computer programming, is an opaque pointer, i.e., a datatype that hides its internal implementation using a pointer
 Adjustment handles, little boxes for resizing a GUI control
 Handle System, a system for uniquely numbering digital objects
 Handle-o-Meter, a machine that measures surface friction and flexibility of sheeted materials

Other uses
 Handle (mathematics), a topological ball
 Handle, in gambling, is the total amount bet, usually at a given place or for a given event
 Handle, a half-gallon (1.75 L) bottle of liquor; see alcohol measurements

See also
 Handel (disambiguation)
 Hendel
 Hendl